The Church of Christ in China Kei Long College (CCCKLC), is a co-educational subsidized secondary school located in Hong Kong. It was founded in 1982.

A part of the school campus is shared with SKH Bishop Baker Secondary School (Chinese: 聖公會白約翰會督中學). CCCKLC and CCC Kei Yuen College (Chinese: 中華基督教會基元中學) are sister schools.

The school organizer, the Hong Kong Council of the Church of Christ in China, aims at witnessing for Christ in Yuen Long. 

Some subjects such as Maths and Integrated Science are taught in English as medium of instruction in the junior forms.

References

Protestant secondary schools in Hong Kong
Hong Kong Council of the Church of Christ in China